Cathedral Peak is a mountain in KwaZulu-Natal, South Africa. The mountain is also known as Mponjwana (Little Horn) by the local Amangwane people.

Cathedral Peak is part of the Cathedral Ridge which is at right angles to the main range. Other peaks in the spur are the Twins, also known as the Triplets, (2,899 m or 9,510 feet), the Bell (2,930 m or 9,800 feet), the Outer (3,006 m or 9,860 feet) and Inner (3,005 m or 9,858 feet) Horns, the Chessmen (2,987 m or 9,800 feet) and Mitre Peak (3,023 m or 9,919 feet).

Cathedral Peak was first climbed by D.W. Basset-Smith and R.G. Kingdon in 1917, via the gully.

References

Drakensberg
Climbing areas of South Africa